There are at least 25 named lakes and reservoirs in Deer Lodge County, Montana.

Lakes
 Barker Lakes, el. 
 Daly Lake, el. 
 Emerald Lake, el. 
 Fourmile Basin Lakes, el. 
 Haggin Lake, el. 
 Hearst Lake, el. 
 Hicks Lake (Montana), el. 
 Lake of the Isle, el. 
 LaMarche Lake, el. 
 Lost Lakes, el. 
 Lower Seymour Lake, el. 
 Miller Lake, el. 
 Mudd Lake, el. 
 Oreamnos Lake, el. 
 Pintler Lake, el. 
 Rainbow Lake, el. 
 Tenmile Lakes, el. 
 Toomey Lake, el. 
 Twin Lakes, el. 
 Upper Seymour Lake, el. 
 Warren Lake, el.

Reservoirs
 Georgetown Lake, el. 
 Silver Lake, el. 
 Storm Lake, el. 
 Thornton Lake, el.

See also
 List of lakes in Montana

Notes

Bodies of water of Deer Lodge County, Montana
Deer Lodge